"Only Love" is a song written by Camilo Sesto Robbie Buchanan and Mark Spiro and it was first recorded by Englebert Humperdinck sometime in between the 1970s and 1980s, and was then recorded by the late tejano singer Selena in 1989 and was not released until 1996, when it was released for the first time on her 1996 tribute album Siempre Selena and then again on the Selena movie soundtrack a year later in 1997 following Selena's death in 1995. The song was to be developed for her English crossover album or remain a simple unreleased song.

Covers
 Selena recorded this song in 1989, and presumably performed the song during her Ven Conmigo Tour but no live performances of this song can be found on YouTube.

Tribute Covers
Millie Corretjer recorded a slight Spanish cover of Selena's rendition of the song called "Solo Tu" and released it on her 1995 album Sola.

References

Engelbert Humperdinck songs
Selena songs
1997 songs
Songs written by Mark Spiro
Songs written by Robbie Buchanan
Song recordings produced by A. B. Quintanilla